Romford Greyhound Stadium, referred to as Coral Romford Greyhound Stadium is a greyhound racing track located in Romford town centre in the London Borough of Havering in east London which is owned and operated by the Ladbrokes Coral group. The stadium has a capacity for over 1,700 people.

The stadium has won several awards including the British Greyhound Racing Board's 'Racecourse of the Year' award in 1998 and again in 2003. Following the closure of Wimbledon Stadium in March 2017, it is one of only two stadiums left in London or Greater London, the other being Crayford Stadium.

Racing
The track is 350 metres in circumference, and the distances raced are 225, 400, 575, 750 and 925 metres.

There are six race meetings each week, on Friday and Saturday evenings, Wednesday and Saturday mornings and two afternoon meetings on Monday and Thursday. During December racing is also held on Tuesday evenings.

Bets for each race can be placed either at the Tote or with the track-side bookmakers.

A number of major open racing events take place at the stadium each year, these include the Cesarewitch (an original classic), the Champion Stakes, the Essex Vase, Romford Puppy Cup, Golden Sprint and Coronation Cup.

Facilities
The stadium consists of the Coral grandstand which is situated on the finishing line side of the track and is split over two levels. It contains two public bars, The Champions Bar and La Roc Bar, Trap 7 Snack Bar and Tote betting facilities. It also contains the Paddock Restaurant, which can seat 200 diners. The Coral grandstand opened on 6 September 2019 after a £10 million refurbishment.

A separate restaurant called The Pavilion is situated on the third bend and can cater for 100 diners. A purpose built Marquee is situated on the fourth bend and contains a bar, snack bar and Tote betting facilities.

Competitions
Cesarewitch
Essex Vase
Champion Stakes
Golden Sprint
Romford Puppy Cup
Coronation Cup

History

Pre-war history and original track
Archer Leggett and his brother-in-law rented a small piece of land near the Crown Hotel just off the London Road in Romford in 1929. They put down £400 to equip the land ready for greyhound racing and opened for business on 21 June and invited privately owned greyhounds to chase a hare driven by an old Ford car engine. The venture only lasted one year because the landlord increased the rent, doubling it to £4 a week which resulted in the decision to move the greyhound operation. Later £600 was raised which enabled Leggett to build a new track with a stand in a field within Belle Vue Meadow adjacent to the London and North Eastern Railway line. The new site was on the south side of the London Road opposite the original venue north of the London Road. It included a hand-operated totalisator and electrically operated hare. The first meeting took place on 20 September 1931 with regular attendances in excess of 1,000 frequenting each meeting.

In 1935 four new directors including Fred Leaney and Michael Pohl joined the original directors and an extra £17,000 investment followed which allowed the track to turn to be converted into a stadium. Extra stands and kennels were constructed by the new company called Romford Stadium Ltd who then turned their attention to the recently purchased Dagenham Greyhound Stadium.

Cheetah racing
The greyhound industry boom allowed companies such as Romford Stadium Ltd to thrive and greyhound racing itself was big business and national news. Before work got underway at Dagenham, Arthur Leggett decided that he was going to bring cheetah racing to the UK. Twelve cheetahs arrived from Kenya in December 1936 courtesy of explorer Kenneth Gandar-Dower. After six months of quarantine the cheetahs were given time to acclimatise before Romford, Harringay and Staines were earmarked for the experiment with the cheetahs running for the first time on Saturday 11 December 1937 at Romford. The experiment failed, with just one further race held; the racing stopped because although the cheetahs were able to better the greyhound times they had to be let off first when racing greyhounds and when they raced against each other they lost interest and stopped chasing the lure.

With the new Dagenham opening in 1938 Leggett next introduced a new event to Romford in 1939 called the Essex Vase. The stadium consisted of the main grandstand on the home straight that featured the Seniors Club and on the back straight was another stand and the Junior Club within. The paddock was on the third bend with the racing kennels and the Racing Managers office. Between the first two bends sat the totalisator and general office, the press office was on the first bend and there was a very unusual Racing Managers box in the middle of the centre green. The track was 380 yards in circumference with distances of 460 & 650 yards and an 'Inside Sumner' hare. The resident kennels were situated in Heaton Grange, 24 acres of ground off Straight Road to the north-east of Romford.

Post-war history

The Essex Cup was discontinued after 1949 for fifteen years and the Racing Manager in the fifties was Les Cox. The Director of Racing Michael Pohl died in 1959, his son Michael J. Pohl Jr. was the assistant to Cox. Trainers attached to the track during this time were Peter Hawkesley, Bill Riley, Bob Thomson and Hubert Gray. George 'Bunny' Gough, former Racing Manager of Powderhall Stadium & Harringay Stadium, joined the track replacing Cox as Racing Manager in the early 1960s but the fallout from the 'Dagenham Coup' was felt by Romford Stadium Ltd in 1965 with the legal costs incurred by Romford Stadium Ltd finally being paid by the off-course bookmakers. It was the end for Dagenham as the company sold the track for £185,000 to a packaging business.

Training appointments towards the end of the decade and start of the 1970s included John Coleman and Terry Duggan and in 1975 a second feature event was added to the tracks portfolio when they introduced the Romford Puppy Cup. During 1976 Arthur Leggett, the Managing Director, on behalf of the company agreed the sale of Romford to Corals.

The new owners invested heavily into the track building a new grandstand which included a state of the art glass-fronted restaurant, the tote and hare system were also replaced. The investment reaped rewards as the track became extremely popular with public and the industry alike. John Sutton was brought in as the Managing Director, Gough was promoted to General Manager and Des Nichols (who was RM in 1975-6 and again in 1978 with Sydney Wood in the interim) were Racing Managers. Coral's signalled their intent by buying Brighton & Hove to double their track assets and preventing Ladbrokes from increasing their group, the latter had been a serious bidder for the two tracks at the same time.

In 1977 local bitch 'Go Ahead Girl' recorded 17 consecutive wins for Duggan and one year later with Corals and Ladbrokes now owning seven tracks the payments for BAGS racing to the National Greyhound Racing Club ended. Instead the tracks would tender for the contracts. Only Hackney, Bristol and Watford along with five bookmaker-owned tracks (one of them being Romford) had BAGS contracts at this time.

Lauries Panther (owned by Laurie James and trained by Terry Duggan) won the 1982 English Greyhound Derby, providing Romford with their greatest moment and both Ballyregan Bob and Scurlogue Champ appeared at the track. The former won the 1985 Essex Vase going through unbeaten and breaking the track record in the final. Three new major events were introduced; the Coronation Cup became Romford's third major trophy in 1986 following the closure of Southend Stadium, the Golden Sprint was inaugurated in 1987 followed by the resurrected Champion Stakes in 1988. In 1996 former Bolton boss Peter O’Dowd became Racing Manager taking over from Steve Daniel who had himself only recently replaced Ray Spalding. Leading Trainers have included Linda Mullins, Peter Payne, Kenny Linzell, Linda Jones, David Mullins and Peter Rich.

21st Century
In 2006 the stadium underwent a £400,000 refurbishment of the main grandstand restaurant. Trainer Paul Young (who joined the track in 2000) won the 2014 Trainers Championship. In 2018 the stadium signed a deal with SIS to race every Monday afternoon, Wednesday evening, Thursday afternoon, Friday evening and twice on a Saturday (morning and evening).

During 2019 a multimillion-pound renovation took place, which included the demolition of the main stand to create more car parking space, a modernisation of the reception area and office buildings, the construction a grand stand and a new track was laid down. The venue remained open throughout with the exception of four day closure in the August. The official re-opening was on 6 September 2019.

In 2020 the Cesarewitch competition was brought back after an eight year dormant period, the event was sponsored by stadium owners Ladbrokes Coral as a category 1 race.

Popular culture
Several Underworld tracks are named after greyhounds that ran at the stadium, including Born Slippy, Sappy's Curry, and Pearl's Girl.

Track records

Current

Former (post-metric)

Former (pre-metric)

References

External links
 Official site
 Information site

Buildings and structures in the London Borough of Havering
Greyhound racing venues in the United Kingdom
Sports venues in London
Tourist attractions in the London Borough of Havering
Greyhound Stadium
Sport in the London Borough of Havering